The following is a list of episodes of the PBS Kids animated show WordGirl, which aired from September 3, 2007 to August 7, 2015. The show originally aired as short segments known as The Amazing Colossal Adventures of WordGirl from November 10, 2006 until October 10, 2007.  The show, in all, aired for 130 half-hour episodes. Almost each one consisted of two separate segments, while others were full half-hour specials.

Series overview
{| class="wikitable"
|-
! style="padding: 0px 8px" colspan="2" rowspan="2"| Season
! style="padding: 0px 8px" rowspan="2"| Episodes
! style="padding: 0px 80px" colspan="2"| Originally aired
|-
! First aired
! Last aired
|-
| bgcolor="Black"|
| style="text-align:center;" | Shorts
| style="text-align:center;" | 30
| style="text-align:center;" | 
| style="text-align:center;" | 
|-
| bgcolor="LightBlue"|
| style="text-align:center;" | 1
| style="text-align:center;" rowspan="2"| 26 each
| style="text-align:center;" | 
| style="text-align:center;" | 
|-
| bgcolor="Pink"|
| style="text-align:center;" | 2
| style="text-align:center;" | 
| style="text-align:center;" | 
|-
| bgcolor="#9ACD32"|
| style="text-align:center;" | 3
| style="text-align:center;" rowspan="6"| 13 each
| style="text-align:center;" | 
| style="text-align:center;" | 
|-
| bgcolor="Yellow"|
| style="text-align:center;" | 4
| style="text-align:center;" | 
| style="text-align:center;" | 
|-
| bgcolor="Violet"|
| style="text-align:center;" | 5
| style="text-align:center;" | 
| style="text-align:center;" | 
|-
| bgcolor="#6495ED"|
| style="text-align:center;" | 6
| style="text-align:center;" | 
| style="text-align:center;" | 
|-
| bgcolor="#B0C4DE"|
| style="text-align:center;" | 7
| style="text-align:center;" | 
| style="text-align:center;" | 
|-
| bgcolor="#FA8072"|
| style="text-align:center;" | 8
| style="text-align:center;" | 
| style="text-align:center;" | 
|}

Shorts (2006–07)
The animated series WordGirl began as a series of shorts titled The Amazing Colossal Adventures of WordGirl that premiered on PBS Kids Go! on November 10, 2006. The two-minute episodes of the show aired at the end of Maya & Miguel, or online along with the one-minute episodes. There were twenty 2-minute episodes and ten 1-minute episodes.

Two minute episodes

One minute episodes

Episodes

Season 1 (2007–09)

Season 2 (2008–10)

Season 3 (2010–11)

Season 4 (2011–12)

Season 5 (2012–13)

Season 6 (2013–14)

Season 7 (2014–15)

Season 8 (2015)

References

External links
 List of WordGirl episodes on pbs.org

Wordgirl
Episodes